Tabitha Lupien (born February 4, 1988) is a Canadian actress and competitive dancer trained in ballet, tap, jazz, pointe, hip hop, and acrobatics. She trains with her sisters Lindsay and Samantha and her brother Isaac at the Canadian Dance Company, owned by her parents Allain and Dawn, located in Oakville, Ontario. She is best known for her role as Julie Ubriacco from Look Who's Talking Now. She had a minor role in the 2007 film version of Hairspray as Becky and guest starred in the TV series The L.A. Complex as a defeated dancer 6 years later.

Filmography

References

External links

Tabitha Lupien at Canadian Dance Company

1988 births
Canadian film actresses
Canadian female dancers
People from Oakville, Ontario
Living people